is a passenger railway station in located in the city of Kainan, Wakayama Prefecture, Japan, operated by West Japan Railway Company (JR West).

Lines

Station layout
The station consists of two elevated island platforms with the station building underneath. The station has a Midori no Madoguchi staffed ticket office.

Platforms

Adjacent stations

|-
!colspan=5|West Japan Railway Company (JR West)

History
It was renamed to its present name on July 1, 1936. With the privatization of the Japan National Railways (JNR) on April 1, 1987, the station came under the aegis of the West Japan Railway Company. The tracks were elevated and the station rebuilt in 1988.

Passenger statistics
In fiscal 2019, the station was used by an average of 2802 passengers daily (boarding passengers only).

Surrounding Area
 Kainan City Hall
 Japan Post Kainan Ono Post Office
 ainan Municipal Third Junior High School

See also
List of railway stations in Japan

References

External links

 Kainan Station Official Site

Railway stations in Wakayama Prefecture
Railway stations in Japan opened in 1924
Kainan, Wakayama